Kondapak is a village in the Medak district of India's Telangana state. The village is surrounded by a nest of 7 Hills, 7 tranquil lakes, 7 glorious Hanuman Temples, 7 silent village foundation stones, and 7 saptanabhi shilas lies this abode of art and architecture.

Geography 

Kondapak is a very prosperous model village located 90 km from Hyderabad and 15 km from the busy commercial district of Siddipet in Telangana, India on Rajiv Rahadari. In the picturesque harmony of dense green forests, in a nest of 7 Hills, 7 tranquil lakes, 7 glorious Hanuman Temples, 7 silent village foundation stones(saptanabhi shilas) lies this abode of art and architecture. Thus this village is glorified with number seven. Its cultural heritage dates back to the Kakatiya Dynasty.

Kondapak has two temples in its Northern Part. One is Sri Rudreshwaralayam and another one is Sri Trikooteswaralayam. They are rich with exquisite sculpture and architecture. They symbolize the soul of this village.

Kondapak Village covers an area of approximately 2.5 km2., and has a population of approximately 15,000 as of 2010. The Kondapak village boundary of the Medak district, the village is bounded on the North by the Nacharam village, on the south by Thimmareddypalli village, on the west by Dhammakkapalli, and on the East by Komaravelli and Arepalli Village. Paddy the main agricultural products cultivated in the village. Some places of historical importance in Kondapak Village are Temples and Schools.

The culture of Kondapak has been shaped by its long history, unique geography, diverse demographics and the absorption of customs, traditions and ideas from some of its neighbours.

Kondapak's great diversity of religious practices, languages, customs, and traditions. The various religions and traditions of Kondapak that were created by these amalgamations have influenced other parts of the world too.

Notable people 

 Ananthula Madan Mohan

List of villages 
Sirisinagandla, Marpadaga, Duddeda, Thimmareddy pally, Kuknurpalle, Lakudaram, Medinpur, Dammakkapally, Ankireddy Pally, Thoguta, Tukkapur, Bandaram, Bandarupalle, Etigaddakistapur, Vellikattu, Vemulaghat, Yellareddy peta, [Erravally, Mangole, Zapti Nacharam, Khammam Pally, Nagireddipally, Giraipalle, Odencheruvu, Pedda Masanpalle, Thurka Kashi Nagar, Konai pally, Thipparam, Bobbaipally, Singaram, Mathe pally, Ramunipally, Domalonipally, Sarlapally, Muddapur, Ambedkarnagar and Pitalawada.

References

External links
 Kondapak.com

Mandal headquarters in Siddipet district
Villages in Siddipet district